Hans Scarsini (3 October 1924 – 25 November 2014) was an Austrian ice hockey player. He competed in the men's tournament at the 1956 Winter Olympics.

References

1924 births
2014 deaths
Austrian ice hockey players
Olympic ice hockey players of Austria
Ice hockey players at the 1956 Winter Olympics
Sportspeople from Klagenfurt